Salma Hassan is Pakistani actress. She is known for her drama roles in Khaani, Do Bol, Juda Huway Kuch Is Tarhan, Pyar Ke Sadqay and Parizaad.

Early life
Salma was born on 1975 in 25 February in Karachi, Pakistan. She completed studies from University of Karachi, she graduated with a Master's degree in history.

Career
Salma made her debut as an actress in 1998 on PTV. Salma made her acting debut in the TV serial Dhoop Mein Sawan on PTV Channel.

Personal life
She was married to director and actor Azfar Ali, with whom she had worked on the TV serial Sub Set Hai of Indus Vision. They have worked together on screen too. They were divorced in 2012. She has one daughter.

Filmography

Television

Web series

Telefilm

Film

References

External links
 
 

1975 births
Living people
20th-century Pakistani actresses
Pakistani television actresses
21st-century Pakistani actresses
Pakistani film actresses